SISD can refer to:

 Single instruction, single data, a computer processor architecture
 CCL5, an 8kDa protein also using the symbol SISD
 Sixteen-segment display
 Several school districts in Texas. See List of school districts in Texas - S
 Saginaw Intermediate School District (Michigan)
 Southeast Island School District (Alaska)
 Swiss International Scientific School in Dubai